Potassium canrenoate (INN, JAN) or canrenoate potassium (USAN) (brand names Venactone, Soldactone), also known as aldadiene kalium, the potassium salt of canrenoic acid, is an aldosterone antagonist of the spirolactone group. Like spironolactone, it is a prodrug, and is metabolized to active canrenone in the body.

Potassium canrenoate is notable in that it is the only clinically used antimineralocorticoid which is available for parenteral administration (specifically intravenous) as opposed to oral administration.

In the UK it is unlicensed and only used for short term diuresis in oedema or heart failure in neonates or children under specialist initiation and monitoring.

See also
 Canrenoic acid
 Canrenone

References

11β-Hydroxylase inhibitors
Aldosterone synthase inhibitors
Antimineralocorticoids
CYP17A1 inhibitors
Pregnanes
Potassium compounds
Prodrugs
Progestogens
Spirolactones
Steroidal antiandrogens